Pupa is a  genus of small sea snails, marine gastropod molluscs in the family Acteonidae.

The genus is named Pupa because the shell of these snails resemble an insect pupa in overall shape. The animal has a large headshield with a deep median slit, separating it into two posteriorly projecting lobes.

Species

According to the World Register of Marine Species (WoRMS), the following species are included within the genus Pupa:
 Pupa affinis (Adams, 1854)
 Distribution : South Africa, Red Sea, Indo-Pacific
 Length : 11–20 mm
 Description : cream-colored shell with horizontal spiraled patterns (dark brown, light brown or greenish) without dark borders; sharp apex
 Pupa alveola (Souverbie, 1863)
 Distribution : Indo-Pacific
 Pupa coccinata Reeve, 1842 (considered by some to be a color form of Pupa strigosa)
 Distribution : Japan, tropical Indo-West Pacific
 Length : 25 mm
 Description : headshield flaps cover the opening of the mantle cavity; white-colored with many orange-red spots in spiraling bands
 Pupa davisi Kilburn, 1975
 Distribution: South Africa
 Length : 12.5 mm
 Description : cream-colored shell with sharp apex.
 Pupa hyalina Verco, 1907
 Pupa niecaensis Barnard, 1963
 Pupa nitulida (Lamarck, 1816) Smooth pink pupa
 Pupa pascuana Raines, 2002
 Pupa pudica (Adams, 1854)
 Distribution: Hawaii
 Length : 7 mm
 Description : pink-colored elongate shell, with spiral bands of lightbrown patterns.
 † Pupa reticulata (Martin, 1884)
 Pupa sekii Habe, 1958 
 Pupa sinica Lin, 1989
 Pupa solidula Linnaeus, 1758 Solid pupa
 Pupa strigosa (Gould, 1859)
 Pupa sulcata (Gmelin, 1791) Furrowed pupa
 Distribution : cosmopolitan, tropical Indo-Pacific, Kermadec Islands, Japan
 Length : 10–25 mm
 Description : intertidal and up to depths of 30 m, burrowing in the sand; lightbrown shell with horizontal darker bands, where the darkest parts form a vertical band; sharp apex
 Pupa suturalis (Adams, 1854)
 Distribution : Indo-Pacific
 Pupa tessellata (Reeve, 1842)
 Pupa tragulata Iredale, 1936
Species brought into synonymy
 Pupa (Rictaxiella) Habe, 1958: synonym of Rictaxiella Habe, 1958
 Pupa alba (Hutton, 1873): synonym of Abida bigerrensis (Moquin-Tandon, 1856)
 Pupa amodesta Mighels, 1845: synonym of Pronesopupa amodesta (Mighels, 1845) (original combination)
 Pupa bourguignati Deshayes, 1863 (original combination): synonym of Gonospira bourguignati (Deshayes, 1863)
 Pupa bryanti L. Pfeiffer, 1867: synonym of Cerion rubicundum (Menke, 1829) (junior synonym)
 Pupa choshiensis (Habe, 1958): synonym of Rictaxiella choshiensis Habe, 1958
 Pupa cinerea Draparnaud, 1801: synonym of Solatopupa similis (Bruguière, 1792)
 Pupa crassilabris G. B. Sowerby II, 1875: synonym of Cerion striatellum (Guerin-Méneville, 1829)
 Pupa daedalea Deshayes, 1851: synonym of Plagiodontes daedaleus (Deshayes, 1851)
 Pupa detrita L. Pfeiffer, 1854: synonym of Cerion incanum (Leidy, 1851)
 Pupa flammea (Gmelin, 1791): synonym of Maxacteon flammeus (Bruguière, 1789)
 Pupa fusus L. Pfeiffer, 1848: synonym of Gonospira palanga (Lesson, 1831)
 Pupa gibba R. T. Lowe, 1852: synonym of Leiostyla gibba (R. T. Lowe, 1852) (original combination)
 Pupa grisebla Röding, 1798: synonym of Pupa solidula (Linnaeus, 1758)
 Pupa incana Leidy, 1851>: synonym of Cerion incanum (Leidy, 1851)
 Pupa incrassata G. B. Sowerby II, 1878: synonym of Cerion incrassatum (G. B. Sowerby II, 1878) (original combination)
 Pupa intersecta Deshayes, 1863: synonym of Gonospira bourguignati (Deshayes, 1863)
 Pupa kirki (Hutton, 1873): synonym of Pupa affinis (A. Adams, 1855)
 Pupa nivea (Angas, 1871)  synonym of Pupa affinis (A. Adams, 1855)
 Pupa novoseelandica L. Pfeiffer, 1853: synonym of Phenacharopa novoseelandica (L. Pfeiffer, 1853)
 Pupa palanga Lesson, 1831: synonym of Gonospira palanga (Lesson, 1831)
 Pupa pusilla Des Moulins, 1835: synonym of Chondrina bigorriensis (Des Moulins, 1835)
 Pupa roseomaculata Iredale, 1936: synonym of Pupa solidula (Linnaeus, 1758)
 † Pupa starboroughensis L. C. King, 1934 : synonym of † Crenilabium starboroughense (L. C. King, 1934) 
 Pupa thaanumi Pilsbry, 1917: synonym of Pupa affinis (Adams, 1854)
 Pupa turrita Anton, 1839: synonym of Clessinia striata (Spix, 1827) (junior synonym)
 Pupa umbilicata Draparnaud, 1801: synonym of Lauria cylindracea (da Costa, 1778)
 Pupa uvula Deshayes, 1863: synonym of Gonospira uvula (Deshayes, 1863) (original combination)
 Pupa vermiculosa Morelet, 1860: synonym of Leiostyla vermiculosa (Morelet, 1860) (original combination)
 Pupa versipolis L. Pfeiffer, 1841: synonym of Gonospira versipolis (L. Pfeiffer, 1841)
Taxa inquirenda (use in recent literature currently undocumented)
 Pupa dormeyeri G. B. Sowerby II, 1878
 Pupa gracilis G. B. Sowerby I, 1834
 Pupa maugeri G. B. Sowerby I, 1834 
 Pupa ringens G. B. Sowerby II, 1878
 Pupa zebra G. B. Sowerby II, 1875 

The database Indo-Pacific Molluscan Database (OBIS) also includes the following names in current use :
 Pupa acuta
 Pupa fraterculus
 Pupa insculpta

 Pupa clathrata Yokoyama, 1922 
 Distribution : Japan

 Pupa fumata Gould, 1859 Brown Pupa
 Distribution : tropical, Western Australia, Indo-Pacific
 Length : 20 mm
 Description : shell with spiral ribs; patterns of brown or gray spots on a cream-colored background; whorls separated by a white narrow band.

References

 Higo, S., Callomon, P. & Goto, Y. (1999) Catalogue and Bibliography of the Marine Shell-Bearing Mollusca of Japan. Elle Scientific Publications, Yao, Japan, 749 pp.

External links
  Röding, P.F. 1798. Museum Boltenianum sive Catalogus cimeliorum e tribus regnis naturae quae olim collegerat Joa. Hamburg : Trappii 199 pp.
 Schumacher, C. F. (1817). Essai d'un nouveau système des habitations des vers testacés. Schultz, Copenghagen. iv + 288 pp., 22 pls
 Powell A. W. B., New Zealand Mollusca, William Collins Publishers Ltd, Auckland, New Zealand 1979 
 Photo
 Nomenclator Zoologicus info
 

Acteonidae
Gastropod genera